Martin Haring (born 24 December 1986) is a Slovak cyclo-cross, road, and cross-country cyclist, who currently rides for UCI Continental team . He represented his nation in the men's elite event at the 2016 UCI Cyclo-cross World Championships  in Heusden-Zolder.

Major results

Road

2007
 7th Grand Prix Bradlo
2009
 5th Overall Tour du Cameroun
2012
 1st Stage 3 Sibiu Cycling Tour
2015
 7th Overall Tour du Cameroun
1st Mountains classification
2017
 1st  National Hill Climb Championships
 4th Overall Tour du Cameroun
 5th Overall Gemenc Grand Prix
2018
 1st  Points classification Okolo Slovenska
 2nd Overall Tour du Cameroun
1st Stage 4
 3rd Time trial, National Road Championships
2020
 1st  Overall Tour de Serbie
 2nd Time trial, National Road Championships
 7th Overall Tour of Bulgaria
 10th Overall Tour of Szeklerland
2021
 4th Time trial, National Road Championships
 9th Overall Tour of Bulgaria
 9th Grand Prix Gündoğmuş

Cyclo-cross

2007–2008
 2nd National Under-23 Championships
2011–2012
 2nd National Championships
2012–2013
 1st  National Championships
 3rd Cyclo-cross International Podbrezova
2013–2014
 1st  National Championships
 1st Cyclo-cross International Podbrezová
 1st Tage des Querfeldeinsports
 3rd Ziklokross Igorre
2014–2015
 1st  National Championships
 1st CX Marikovská Dolina
2015–2016
 1st  National Championships
 1st Int. Radquerfeldein GP Lambach
 3rd Internationales Radquer Steinmaur
 3rd Cyclo-cross International Podbrezova
2016–2017
 1st  National Championships
 Toi Toi Cup
2nd Mladá Boleslav
2017–2018
 1st  National Championships
 Slovensky pohar v cyklokrose
1st GP Kosice
1st GP Trnava
1st GP Dolná Krupa
3rd GP Rakova
3rd GP Poprad
 1st Tage des Querfeldeinsports
 2nd Cyclocross International Podbrezová
 Toi Toi Cup
2nd Hlinsko
2018–2019
 3rd National Championships
 3rd Grand Prix Topoľčianky
2019–2020
 2nd National Championships
2021–2022
 3rd National Championships

MTB

2012
 2nd National XCO Championships
2013
 1st  National XCM Championships
 2nd National XCO Championships
2014
 1st  National XCM Championships
2017
 1st  National XCO Championships
 1st  National XCM Championships
2018
 1st  National XCO Championships
2019
 1st  National XCO Championships
2020
 1st  National XCO Championships

References

External links

1986 births
Living people
Cyclo-cross cyclists
Slovak male cyclists
Sportspeople from Zvolen